Sola Fosudo  (born 1958) is a Nigerian prolific dramatist, scholar, critic, film actor and director.

Early life and career
Sola hails from Lagos State.
He was trained as a dramatist at Obafemi Awolowo University and University of Ibadan where he obtained a Master of Art degree in drama.
He has featured and directed several Nigerian films.
He is the head of the Department of Theatre Art, Lagos State University and the university's director of information.

Selected filmography
 True Confession 
Glamour Girls I
Rituals 
Strange Ordeal
Iyawo the Alhaji
Family on Fire (2011)

References

External links

1960 births
Living people
Nigerian male film actors
Place of birth missing (living people)
Male actors in Yoruba cinema
Academic staff of Lagos State University
21st-century Nigerian male actors
Male actors from Lagos State
University of Ibadan alumni
Obafemi Awolowo University alumni
Yoruba actors
Nigerian film directors
Nigerian dramatists and playwrights
20th-century Nigerian male actors